Bad Wilsnack station is a railway station in the municipality of Bad Wilsnack, located in the Prignitz district in Brandenburg, Germany.

Notable places nearby
Holy Blood of Wilsnack

References

Railway stations in Brandenburg
Buildings and structures in Prignitz